A  is the term for a Japanese emperor who had abdicated and entered the Buddhist monastic community by receiving the Pravrajya rite.

Cloistered emperors sometimes acted as Daijō Tennō (retired emperors), therefore maintaining effective power. This title was first assumed by Emperor Shōmu and was later used by many other emperors who "took the tonsure", signifying a decision to become a Buddhist monk. The last cloistered emperor was Emperor Reigen (r. 1663-1687) in the Edo period.

List of retired emperors who became monks

See also
Emperor Daijō
Cloistered rule

Notes

References
 Ponsonby-Fane, Richard Arthur Brabazon. (1956).  Kyoto: The Old Capital of Japan, 794-1869. Kyoto: The Ponsonby Memorial Society. OCLC 36644
 _. (1963).  Vicissitudes of Shinto. Kyoto: Ponsonby Memorial Society. OCLC 36655
 

Japanese emperors
Abdication
 
 
 

Ancient_Japanese_institutions